Putsj is a magazine affiliated with the Norwegian environmental organisation Natur og Ungdom (Nature and Youth). The magazine was started in 2000. It is a youth magazine writing about topics related to youth, activism, culture and environmentalism. The headquarters of the magazine is in Oslo.

Putsj is a print and a web magazine. The paper issue is published four times a year. The magazine is designed by Isabelle Poole and edited by Sol Sandvik. In addition to these, idealistic writers, photographers and illustrators contribute to the making of Putsj.

References

External links
Putsj official website

2000 establishments in Norway
Bi-monthly magazines published in Norway
Environmental magazines
Magazines established in 2000
Magazines published in Oslo
Nature and Youth
Norwegian-language magazines
Political magazines published in Norway
Youth magazines